Orígenes is the ninth studio album recorded by Mexican singer Alejandro Fernández. Produced by Kiko Campos and Pedro Ramírez, with this album he returns to his "origins" recording an album of Mexican music, but this time with his own style. He shot videos for the songs "Tantita Pena" and "Si Tú No Vuelves".

The singer received a Latin Grammy nomination for Best Ranchero Album in the Latin Grammy Awards of 2002; however, he lost to his father Vicente Fernández with the album Más con el Número Uno. Orígenes also was nominated for a 2002 Lo Nuestro Award for Pop Album of the Year.

Track listing
 Tantita Pena (Kiko Campos, Fernando Riba) – 3:28
 Si Tu No Vuelves (Fato) – 3:14
 Amor De Luna (Kiko Campos, Fernando Riba) – 3:05
 ¡Ay Amor! (Manuel Monterrosas) – 2:30
 Como Pez En El Agua (Jorge Massias) – 3:19
 ¿Donde Vas Tan Sola? (Manuel Monterrosas) – 2:51
 Duerme Tranquila (Fato) – 3:29
 Tu Desvario (Kiko Campos, Fernando Riba) – 4:06
 Jamas Te Vi Tan Linda (Roberto Cantoral) – 3:42
 Pajaro Perdido (Nicolas Urquiza) – 3:36
 El Monstruo (Fato) – 4:17
 Ingrato Amor (Kiko Campos, Fernando Riba) – 3:14
 Tu Regresaras (Manuel Monterrosas) – 2:35
 Bonus Track: Las Mañanitas

Charts

Album

Singles

Sales and certifications

References

2001 albums
Alejandro Fernández albums